The 1906–07 United States Senate elections were held on various dates in various states. As these U.S. Senate elections were prior to the ratification of the Seventeenth Amendment in 1913, senators were chosen by state legislatures. Senators were elected over a wide range of time throughout 1906 and 1907, and a seat may have been filled months late or remained vacant due to legislative deadlock. In these elections, terms were up for the senators in Class 2.

The Republican Party gained three seats in the United States Senate, expanding their majority to more twice that of the opposing Democratic Party. The elections were held alongside the 1906 House of Representatives elections, which saw a significant Democratic gain in contrast to the Senate elections.

In Georgia, the legislature failed to elect until shortly after the beginning of the 60th Congress on March 4. In Rhode Island, the legislature deadlocked and did not elect a Senator until well into 1908.

Results summary 
Senate party division, 60th Congress (1907–1909)

 Majority party: Republican (60)
 Minority party: Democratic (28)
 Other prties: 0
 Vacancies: 2
 Total seats: 90

Change in composition

Before the elections 
At the beginning of 1906.

Result of the general elections

Beginning of the next Congress

Race summaries

Elections during the 59th Congress 
In these elections, the winners were seated during 1906 or in 1907 before March 4; ordered by election date.

In this election, the winner was seated March 4, 1909, in the 61st Congress.

Elections leading to the 60th Congress 
In these regular elections, the winners were elected for the term beginning March 4, 1907; ordered by state.

All of the elections involved the Class 2 seats.

Elections during the 60th Congress 
In these elections, the winners were elected in 1907 after March 4; sorted by election date.

Alabama 

The two new senators, John H. Bankhead and Joseph F. Johnston, were named "alternate" senators at the state Democratic primary in 1906.  The men who would beat them both died so Bankhead and Johnston were elected in their places.

Class 2

Alabama (regular, class 2) 

Five-term Democrat John Tyler Morgan was re-elected January 22, 1907.

Alabama (special, class 2) 

Morgan died June 11, 1907, just three months into his sixth term.  Democrat John H. Bankhead was appointed June 18, 1907, to continue the term, pending a July 16, 1907, special election, which he won.

Class 3

Alabama (regular, class 3) 

Two-term Democrat Edmund Pettus was re-elected early on January 22, 1907, for the term that would begin in 1909.

Alabama (special, class 3) 

Pettus died July 27, 1907, even before his new term was supposed to begin.  Democrat Joseph F. Johnston was elected August 6, 1907, both to finish the term and to the next term.

Arkansas

Colorado

Delaware

Delaware (special)

Delaware (regular)

Georgia

Georgia (regular)

Georgia (special)

Idaho

Illinois

Iowa

Kansas

Kansas (regular)

Kansas (special)

Kentucky

Louisiana

Maine

Massachusetts

Michigan

Michigan (regular)

Michigan (special)

Minnesota

Mississippi

Montana

Nebraska

New Hampshire

New Jersey

North Carolina

Oklahoma

Oregon

Oregon (regular)

Oregon (special)

Rhode Island

South Carolina

South Dakota

Tennessee

Texas

Virginia

West Virginia

Wisconsin (special)

Wyoming

See also 
 1906 United States elections
 1906 United States House of Representatives elections
 59th United States Congress
 60th United States Congress

Notes

References